East Kingston is a town in Rockingham County, New Hampshire, United States. The population was 2,441 at the 2020 census.

History 

East Kingston was once a part of Kingston called "Kingston East Parish", but was granted a separate charter in 1738 by Governor Jonathan Belcher. Several residents of East Kingston had petitioned Governor Belcher that its location was too distant from the Kingston school and place of worship.

The town grew up around the saw and grist mill at the Trickling Falls on the edge of Powwow Pond. Farms prospered on the good soil, and ice-cutting in the Powwow River was a thriving winter business before the age of refrigeration. The New England Brick Company was once a principal industry.

Geography
The southern half of East Kingston is drained by the Powwow River, a tributary of the Merrimack River, while the remainder is drained by Great Brook, a tributary of the Exeter River, which ultimately drains to the Atlantic Ocean via Great Bay. A very small portion of  Powwow Pond on the Powwow River lies within the town. Roughly the northern half of East Kingston lies within the Piscataqua River (Coastal) watershed, with the southern half of town located in the Merrimack River watershed.

Adjacent municipalities
 Exeter, New Hampshire (northeast)
 Kensington, New Hampshire (east)
 South Hampton, New Hampshire (south)
 Newton, New Hampshire (southwest)
 Kingston, New Hampshire (west)

Demographics

As of the census of 2000, there were 1,784 people, 629 households, and 508 families residing in the town.  The population density was 178.6 people per square mile (68.9/km2).  There were 648 housing units at an average density of 64.9 per square mile (25.0/km2).  The racial makeup of the town was 98.04% White, 0.11% African American, 0.06% Native American, 0.34% Asian, 0.06% Pacific Islander, 0.95% from other races, and 0.45% from two or more races. Hispanic or Latino of any race were 0.34% of the population.

There were 629 households, out of which 38.3% had children under the age of 18 living with them, 73.9% were married couples living together, 4.6% had a female householder with no husband present, and 19.2% were non-families. 13.5% of all households were made up of individuals, and 4.3% had someone living alone who was 65 years of age or older.  The average household size was 2.84 and the average family size was 3.13.

In the town, the population was spread out, with 27.3% under the age of 18, 4.0% from 18 to 24, 33.2% from 25 to 44, 28.1% from 45 to 64, and 7.4% who were 65 years of age or older.  The median age was 38 years. For every 100 females, there were 92.9 males.  For every 100 females age 18 and over, there were 95.6 males.

The median income for a household in the town was $65,197, and the median income for a family was $71,705. Males had a median income of $52,885 versus $34,702 for females. The per capita income for the town was $28,844.  About 3.2% of families and 4.4% of the population were below the poverty line, including 6.5% of those under age 18 and none of those age 65 or over.

Government
Like most New England towns, East Kingston has a government run by a board of selectmen. The town holds town meetings in the town hall.

Notable people 

 Tom Eaton (born 1971), Grammy-nominated composer
 Daniel Tilton (1763–1830), Mississippi territorial judge
 Ebenezer Webster (1739–1806), militia colonel during the American Revolution

References

External links
 
 Eastkingston.org, unofficial website
 New Hampshire Economic and Labor Market Information Bureau Profile

 
Towns in Rockingham County, New Hampshire
Towns in New Hampshire